The 2020 Iowa Democratic presidential caucuses, the first nominating contest in the Democratic Party primaries for the 2020 presidential election, took place on February 3, 2020. Pete Buttigieg received the most state delegate equivalents (SDEs) and therefore the most delegates, with one SDE and two delegates more than Bernie Sanders, who had narrowly won the popular vote with 26.5%. It was the first time that the Iowa caucuses published the popular vote results of their contest. Buttigieg became the first openly gay person to ever earn the most delegates in a state's presidential contest in the United States. The Iowa caucuses were closed caucuses, wherein only registered members of a party were eligible to vote, and awarded 49 delegates to the 2020 Democratic National Convention, of which 41 were pledged delegates allocated on the basis of the results of the caucuses.

The 2020 Iowa Democratic caucuses were controversial due to the delays in reporting the results. These delays, caused in part by problems with a mobile application created by Shadow Inc. that was used to report voting totals, led to the resignation of Iowa Democratic Party chair Troy Price. Further controversy resulted from errors and inconsistencies regarding the calculation and reporting of State Delegate Equivalents (SDEs) in several caucus locations. Following a three-day delay in vote reporting, the Iowa Democratic Party declared that Buttigieg had won two more delegates than Sanders.

The official result and calculation of pledged national convention delegates was delayed until six days after the election due to the need for a correction of reported results from 3.1% (55) of the precincts. Buttigieg and Sanders then requested a partial recanvass for 8.1% of the official result, which resulted in Buttigieg's lead over Sanders narrowing to 0.08 SDEs. A final recount for 63 of the recanvassed precincts (3.6% of all results) was requested by both campaigns on February 19. Two days later, the Iowa Democratic Party announced that it had accepted recount requests for 23 precincts (1.3% of all results). The recounts took place from February 25 to February 27, with the Iowa Democratic Party announcing the results of the recounts on February 27, 2020. The results were certified by the state committee on February 29. The Associated Press at that point still refused to call a winner due to too many discrepancies in the precinct vote records, though they acknowledged the official results in their delegate count, and Sanders challenged the results after certification before the DNC Rules and Bylaws Committee, but there were no media reports about the outcome of that challenge.

Despite his underperformance, Biden would go on to win the nomination, becoming the first candidate to do so without winning Iowa since Bill Clinton in 1992. Additionally, with Biden defeating incumbent president Donald Trump in the general election, he became the first candidate to do so without finishing in the top 3 in Iowa since the conception of the caucuses in 1972.

Procedure

As the event was a closed caucus, only Iowans registered as Democrats could vote. However, Iowans who did not register as Democrats before the caucus day could still register as such on caucus night itself at their designated precinct, thereby gaining full voting rights at the event. The votes are cast by physically standing in a section of the caucus site corresponding to the preferred candidate. Proxy voting or absentee voting (i.e. by mail or through participation in a preceding "virtual caucus") was not allowed.

1,678 Iowa precinct caucuses and 87 satellite caucuses around the world (organized as alternative voting sites for registered Democratic Iowans who were unable to vote locally at their precinct caucus) were held, with doors being closed at 7:00pm CST on February 3, 2020, in order to elect precinct delegates for the subsequent county conventions and allocate the state's 41 pledged national convention delegates based upon the proportional accumulative result of all the precincts.

Precinct caucus procedures

In all precinct caucuses that elect more than one county convention delegate, the presidential candidates must meet a viability threshold within the individual precinct in order to qualify as a viable candidate. The thresholds are:
 a minimum of 25% for precincts electing only two delegates;
 a minimum of 16.66% for precincts electing only three delegates; and
 a minimum of 15% for the majority of precincts electing more than three delegates.

After the first round of voting, supporters of viable candidates have their votes locked to their chosen candidate, while the supporters of nonviable candidates are allowed through a second final round of voting (called realignment) to transfer their vote either to an alreadyviable candidate or to a nonviable group as long as they make it viable. If the number of viable groups formed in the first round or final round exceeds the number of electable county convention delegates in the precinct, then the smallest viable group(s) are forced to realign until the number of viable groups no longer exceeds the number of delegates. Precinct caucuses that elect a single county convention delegate have no viability threshold and thus do not need to go through realignment, but instead elect their single delegate based upon a simple majority vote expressed by the "first alignment" round.

After the final realignment round has ended and the correct maximum number of viable groups formed, then each of those viable groups (supporting a candidate or being uncommitted) elects the county convention delegate(s) their group won according to its proportional percentage share of the qualified votes won after the final alignment in the local precinct. However, due to rounding errors, it is still possible, by following the outlined calculation procedure, that the total number of county convention delegates awarded by the precinct will be higher or lower than the delegate number to which the precinct is entitled. Therefore, as a last correctional step, the viable groups might also gain or lose a delegate depending on the size of their calculated delegate fraction before rounding in order to compensate for the rounding issue. In this last correctional rounding procedure, a special rule ensures that a group can never lose its only county convention delegate won (meaning that a fractional 0.5 delegate calculated to have been won by a group will always be rounded up to one, even when other larger groups are calculated to have higher fractions).

A summary in the table below, display the ratio between state delegate equivalents (SDE's) and county convention delegates (CCD) for all of Iowa's 99 counties. Each county has a different SDE ratio per county convention delegate, with the most populous counties having the highest SDE ratio and the least populous counties having the lowest SDE ratio. The ratio is used when each county converts the results of won county convention delegates into the number of won SDE's. The use of a different ratio in each county mean, that some county convention delegates will be counted to be more worth in SDE-terms compared to their fellow county convention delegates elected in other counties (similar to the principle of the United States Electoral College, where it is possible to win the popular vote without winning the race deciding delegate count).

Satellite caucus procedures

For the first time in the history of the Iowa caucuses, satellite caucuses around the world (60 in-state and 27 out-of-state) were all organized on election day February 3, as alternative voting sites for registered Democratic Iowans who were unable to vote locally at their precinct caucus. The list below display all types of satellite sites (of which most were open for participation of all Iowans, while some were closed caucuses only for those with a private residence or workplace affiliation):
 14 working-related sites
 24 student sites on college campuses
 29 sites accommodating accessibility needs (including aging service centers)
 11 sites accommodating language and culture needs
 9 out-of-state sites accommodating Iowans wintering in another state

Doors at most satellite caucuses closed at 7:00 pm CST; while some satellite caucuses however closed doors a few hours earlier or later (between 10 am to 8:30 pm CST of the same day).

Iowa Democrats who are out-of-state on February 3 and want to participate in an out-of-state satellite caucus, as well as those who were in-state but were unable to attend their precinct caucus and therefore have to take part in an early in-state satellite caucus before 6:00 pm CST, all need to pre-register their attendance for these satellite events (including a membership of the Democratic Party) by January 17, 2020. Iowans who instead attend an in-state satellite caucus at 7:00 pm CST or later, however, do not need to pre-register attendance and party membership, as they will be granted the same opportunity as precinct caucusgoers to change their party registration at the door. Those Iowans who participate in any form of satellite caucus will be barred from participating in their designated precinct caucus.

The voting procedure for satellite caucuses was largely identical to the one used for precinct caucuses. However, it differs by the fact that no real county convention delegates are elected; instead, each satellite caucus will be granted a number of "virtual county delegates" depending on the number of caucus attendees:

The viability threshold for a group supporting a presidential candidate at a satellite caucus is also set at a minimum of 15%. The calculation rules for allocating "virtual" delegates at a satellite caucus are identical with those used when allocating "real" elected county convention delegates at a precinct caucus.

Accumulated results (number of won virtual county delegates being recalculated to SDEs) of the satellite caucuses are reported from five designated "virtual satellite counties":
 One in each of Iowa's four congressional districts, where the results from all in-state satellite caucuses will be reported and added up within each congressional district.
 One at-large statewide satellite county, where the results from all out-of-state satellite caucuses will be reported and added up.

In addition to the number of precinct elected district and state delegates (elected at the county convention as per the accumulated SDE result of each precinct caucus), each satellite county and their satellite caucuses will also be allocated an additional amount of real district and state delegates (who will not be present at county conventions but only participate in the district convention and state convention).

The available number of the satellite elected district and state delegates will depend on the accumulated voter turnout from all satellite caucuses within respectively each of the four virtual congressional district satellite counties (for in-state satellite caucuses) and within the fifth virtual at-large statewide satellite county (for out-of-state satellite caucuses). Each virtual satellite county will hereby allocate the following number of SDEs among its satellite caucuses:

The amount of available SDEs to be won in each satellite caucus will be decided based on its proportional allocated share of the "total number of virtual county delegates allocated throughout all satellite caucuses within its own virtual satellite county", which shall be equal to its share of allocated available SDEs within its virtual county.

When the accumulated satellite county SDEs finally gets converted to satellite elected "district and state delegates" for each satellite county as a whole, all presidential candidates having won SDEs within the specific satellite county at a share of less than 15% will have all their SDEs eliminated (meaning they will win 0 district and state delegates), while the remaining qualified presidential candidates having won at least a 15% SDE share within the specific satellite county then finally will win a number of delegates equal to their share of qualified SDEs (with fractions rounded up/down to nearest integers).

As part of the caucus procedures, each satellite caucus will have written down potential candidates among its caucusgoers for the available additional "district and state delegate" positions, later to be selected by the preference of the presidential campaigns to which they have pledged support.

County, district, state convention and national convention delegates

A total of 11,402 county convention delegates are elected according to the procedure described above across 1,678 precinct caucuses and 87 satellite caucuses. They will then go to their local county convention on March 21, to choose 2,107 district and state delegates who are pledged to support presidential candidates according to the proportional state delegate equivalents (SDEs) result of the caucuses. These elected districts and state delegates will subsequently go to the district conventions on April 25 (selecting the names of the 27 pledged national convention delegates from the congressional districts) and state convention on June 13 (selecting the names of the remaining statewide elected pledged national convention delegates: nine at-large and five party leaders and elected officials). In total, 41 pledged national convention delegates are elected for the 2020 Democratic National Convention with their pledged support being determined proportionally to the presidential candidate's total number of SDEs won statewide and in each of the state's four congressional districts; but only for those presidential candidates who manage to qualify by winning at least a 15% share of the SDEs statewide or in the specific district. Meaning that all presidential candidates winning less than a 15% share of SDEs statewide and in CD1, CD2, CD3, CD4, will win 0 pledged national convention delegates.

If a presidential candidate based on the statewide caucus result won a number of pledged PLEO delegates or pledged at-large delegates, but then later decides to withdraw as a candidate before the state convention on June 13, their allocation of won pledged PLEO/at-large delegates will then instead be proportionally divided among the other remaining presidential candidates who already managed to qualify with a number of won pledged PLEO/at-large delegates.

The 41 caucus-elected pledged delegates Iowa sends to the national convention are to be joined by eight preselected unpledged PLEO delegates (superdelegates): five members of the Democratic National Committee and three members of Congress (of which all three are U.S. Representatives). The eight superdelegates no longer have the right to cast any decisive vote at the first ballot for determining the Democratic presidential nominee for the presidential election (meaning they can only play a role if allocation of all pledged delegates results in a contested convention); and they are automatically selected independently of the caucus results as unpledged delegates, according to the rules of the Democratic Party.

Key changes from previous caucuses

In previous caucuses (most recently in 2016), the reported precinct results were used to compute the expected number of pledged national convention delegates according to the state delegate equivalents for each presidential candidate, meaning that the campaigns after the precinct caucuses still needed to hold onto their computed expected pledged national convention delegates as their support were locked to the candidate only at the final step of the selection process (i.e. at the state convention in June). This has changed in the 2020 caucuses, where the computed final number of pledged national convention delegates will be locked to the candidates already when the SDEs result of the precinct caucuses are known.

On February 11, 2019, the Iowa Democratic Party proposed several changes to the procedures used in the previous caucuses, including the addition of a period for "virtual caucuses" from January 29 to February 3, 2020, which would allow participants unable to physically attend the precinct caucuses to join in an online virtual caucus or teleconference in which they will be given the opportunity to rank candidate preferences, with support for non-viable candidates redistributed to viable ones. This process continues until no non-viable choices remain, and the results are aggregated with congressional districts for the purposes of delegate allocation, but limited to 10% SDEs, regardless of the number of those using the virtual caucus option. The results of both the virtual and the precinct caucuses were to be released on the night of February 3, and as a result of rules changes by the national party, raw vote totals for the first and second alignment periods of the caucuses were to be published.

In late August 2019, the DNC ordered both the Iowa and the Nevada Democratic state parties to scrap their plans for "virtual caucuses" due to security concerns.

On September 20, 2019, the DNC conditionally approved a plan for "satellite caucus sites", allowing Iowa Democrats to participate if they are working or going to college outside of the state on February 3, 2020. Eleven of those 87 sites will have Spanish translation services. Latinos made up 6% of the population and 3.4% of registered voters.

The party announced in late January 2020 that a "raw vote count" for both the "first initial alignment" and the "second final alignment" would be reported (along with the computed state delegate equivalents and pledged national convention delegates), for the first time in the history of the caucuses. In previous caucuses, the reported result of the precinct caucuses comprised only the final computed state delegate equivalents and expected number of pledged national convention delegates.

Polling

The results of a final poll from The Des Moines Register were not released as scheduled on February 1, after an interviewee complained that Pete Buttigieg was not given as a poll option during their interview, with the omission reportedly attributed to human error. As the polling firm was unable to determine whether the mistake was an isolated incident or not, pollster Ann Selzer decided to withhold the results of the poll altogether, marking the first time in 76 years that the final pre-caucus poll was not released by the Register. The poll was later leaked on Twitter, with results confirmed by FiveThirtyEight showing Sanders in the lead with 22%, followed by Warren with 18%, Buttigieg with 16% and Biden with 13%.

Results 

Neither the final statewide total of "initial alignment votes" nor "final alignment votes" were used to determine the statewide number of "state delegate equivalents" (SDEs) won. Instead, a number of SDEs can be won in each of the 1,678 precinct caucuses and 87 satellite caucuses based upon the final alignment votes in each specific precinct. The number of "pledged national convention delegates" was determined proportionally to the candidate's total number of SDEs won statewide and in each of the state's four congressional districts, but only for those candidates who won more than a 15.0% share of the SDEs statewide or in the specific district.

On the evening of February 6, after a three-day delay for all precinct votes to be reported, the first preliminary count for statewide results was published by the Iowa Democratic Party, which found that Pete Buttigieg had narrowly won the state delegate equivalent (SDE) count over Bernie Sanders, while Sanders won the popular vote on both the first and final caucus alignments (after supporters of non-viable candidates below the 15% threshold redistributed their support to viable ones). Due to various journalists identifying a number of potential errors in the reported vote total and calculated state delegate equivalents, and due to the Democratic National Committee (DNC) suggesting a recanvass of the results would be needed, some major news organizations refused to declare a winner until completion of a possible recanvass or recount.

On the evening of February 9, the Iowa Democratic Party (IDP) had (through their own conducted initial audit of the first preliminary count of statewide results) found the need to correct some incorrectly reported results from 3.1% (55) of the precincts. The corrected result was published as the first final official result before certification (meaning before conducting a formal potential recanvass/recount). The IDP also calculated the number of won pledged national convention delegates on the same basis. The deadline for campaigns to request a recanvass or recount of the results was extended from February7 to February 10, giving campaigns three additional days to review the results and decide whether they want to challenge them, which both the Sanders campaign and the Buttigieg campaign did for 8.1% (143) of the precincts/satellite sites.

The IDP accepted both partial recanvass requests on February 12, and carried out the recanvass from February 16–18 after the campaigns agreed to bear the costs. The recanvass was an audit to check if the initial reporting of figures concurred with the figures displayed on the math worksheet of the voting site. In order to correct the observed mathematical errors on several math worksheets, which were initially signed by all caucus group captains at the respective local voting sites, a subsequent recount process also needed to be called after the conclusion of the recanvass process.

On February 18, the post-recanvass SDE count was released, with Buttigieg leading Sanders by 0.08 SDEs. The following day, the Buttigieg and Sanders campaigns requested a final recount for 63 of the recanvassed precincts (3.6% of all results). On February 21, the IDP announced that it had accepted recount requests for 23 precincts (1.3% of all results). It announced it would recount all 10 precincts requested by the Sanders campaign and 14 of the 54 precincts requested by the Buttigieg campaign, stating it rejected the Buttigieg request to recount the remaining 40 precincts because the campaign had failed to demonstrate that a potential recount of those precincts could result in a different SDE result. The recount began on February 25 and was completed over the following two days. On February 27, the IDP concluded the official recount, resulting in Buttigieg maintaining a slight edge over Sanders in SDEs. Sanders challenged the results of the Iowa caucuses; as of February 29, 2020, that challenge was pending before the Democratic National Committee's Rules and Bylaws Committee, but there were no media reports about how the matter was dealt with or about any following decisions.

Participation in the 2020 caucuses (176,352 initial alignment votes in the official count) was slightly higher than the 171,517 people who participated in the 2016 caucuses, but still 26% lower compared to the over 239,000 people who participated in the 2008 caucuses.

Sanders won the popular vote on both the initial and the final alignments. Former Vice President Joe Biden had a particularly disappointing performance and called it a "gut punch" after winning significantly fewer votes than either Buttigieg or Sanders. Following the caucuses, Buttigieg became the first openly LGBT candidate to win any pledged national convention delegates towards a major party's presidential nomination.

Delay in final results 

Up until February 4 at 4:00 pm local time, the Iowa Democratic Party (IDP) had not reported any final results due to what a party spokesperson described as "quality checks". According to The New York Times, a new app-based reporting system may have been responsible for the delay, with Sean Bagniewski, the Polk County Democratic Party chairman, reporting that only "20% of his 177 precinct chairs" could access the app. In a statement released on February3 at 10:30pm local time, IDP communications director Mandy McClure said "inconsistencies" had been found in the three sets of results. However, McClure also assured that the delay was not the result of a "hack or intrusion" and that the overall results are "sound". During the delay in the release of final results, the campaigns of Pete Buttigieg and Bernie Sanders both released incomplete results taken by their respective precinct captains, respectively showing the two candidates as having won the caucus. Also during the delay, Amy Klobuchar's campaign manager, Justin Buoen, claimed that Klobuchar either exceeded or equaled the number of votes that Joe Biden received.

Problems encountered included usage and interface failures of an app designed to report final vote tallies for Iowa precinct captains; a backlog of phone calls to the state vote-reporting hotline, including at least one case of a precinct captain being placed on an hour-long hold, only to have the hotline attendant immediately hang up on him when finally answering; confusion about coin flips to decide delegates; the need to use backup paper ballots to verify the results; and discrepancies between backup paper ballots and tallies by precinct captains. Reporters found that the Internet message board 4chan had encouraged its members to flood the phone lines of the DNC in Des Moines, which further complicated the process of reporting results. Additionally, the reported data had to be entered manually, which took longer than expected.

The morning after the caucus, Iowa Democratic Party Chair Troy Price issued a clarifying statement, reiterating that he did not believe there was a "cyber security intrusion", and that "data collected via the app was sound". Rather, due to a "coding issue in the reporting system", the app was reporting out only "partial data" from what had been recorded. This flaw was verified by comparison to the paper vote records and examination of the underlying data recorded by the app. The Iowa Democratic Party said in a statement that it planned to release partial results at 4:00pm local time on Tuesday, nearly a full day after caucuses began.

Moreover, several precinct captains reportedly released their results to the Iowa Democratic Party over 24 hours before numbers were reported, with some criticizing the length of time taken for the party to release results as well as the process's lack of transparency.

IowaRecorder app 

The app, named IowaRecorder, was developed by Shadow Inc., a majority-owned subsidiary of Acronym. The company received money from the Biden, Buttigieg, and Kirsten Gillibrand campaigns for services distinct from the app; Biden's campaign paid the firm $1,225 for text messaging, Buttigieg's campaign paid $42,500 for software service, and Gillibrand's campaign paid $37,400 for software, text, and fundraising services.

Social media posts claimed shortly after the election that the Buttigieg campaign had paid for the creation of the app, a theory which was debunked by the Associated Press. The app was also criticized for alleged conflicts of interest due to the company behind the app selling separate services to campaigns associated with Biden, Buttigieg, and Gillibrand; as well as a PAC founded by Tom Steyer and connections to former staffers for Hillary Clinton, among others.

App-development expert Kasra Rahjerdi said "the app was clearly done by someone following a tutorial. It's similar to projects I do with my mentees who are learning how to code." A team of researchers at Stanford University, including former Facebook chief security officer Alex Stamos, said that while analyzing the app they found potentially concerning code within it, including hard-coded API keys. The faulty app coding was found to have caused some incorrect and incomplete result calculation, creating a discrepancy between its data input and data output, which made the app useless for the report of results from all the precinct caucuses (meaning that all data reporting instead had to be phoned/mailed and manually typed into a calculating work sheet).

The app was also criticized for its lack of user-friendliness and openness to potential hacks and data intercepts, though factors such as age of operators may have impacted usability. The youngest-staffed precinct in the state, Sheldon Ward 2, was headed by 20-year-old Caleb Schreurs who was quoted in The N'west Iowa Review saying: “I had zero problem, [the IDP] were very, very secure with it."

Inconsistencies in votes 

During the initial release of the results, it was noted that some of the data being reported were inconsistent, flawed, or entirely impossible. According to The New York Times, more than 100 precincts reported incorrect results. Most common errors included wrong number of delegates being allotted to candidates and disparities in numbers released by the Iowa Democratic Party (IDP) and those reported by precincts. One such example is in Black Hawk County, where the county supervisor independently released results of his county via Facebook that varied from the later-released results provided by the Iowa Democratic Party—which incorrectly gave Elizabeth Warren delegates to Tom Steyer and Bernie Sanders delegates to Deval Patrick, despite the latter reportedly receiving zero votes in the county. Although corrections were later made, these results still varied from those given by the county supervisor.

This quickly gave rise to a number of conspiracy theories online that were accusing the Democratic Party of corruption and cheating in favor of Buttigieg and other candidates at the expense of Sanders. On February 6, three days after the caucus, and with three percent of the results still unreported, the Democratic Party chairman Tom Perez requested a recanvass of the results, saying:

Because Perez specified satellite caucuses in his request for a recanvass, an area where Sanders support was strong, Sanders supporters on social media accused the Democratic National Committee of rigging the caucus against him.

According to the IDP, errors on the handwritten caucus math worksheets could not be corrected because they are unalterable legal records."The incorrect math on the Caucus Math Worksheets must not be changed to ensure the integrity of the process" wrote the party lawyer, Shayla McCormally, according to an email sent by IDP chair Troy Price. Photographs of caucus math worksheets taken by caucus "captains" showed errors in adding up votes for candidates and in calculating "state delegate equivalents". IDP chair Troy Price said that a recount of votes would be required to correct the miscalculations on the handwritten tally sheets from precincts.

Analysis

According to entrance polls by CNN, the close result was due to splits among key demographic groups: gender, educational attainment and age. Buttigieg won women with 24%, while Sanders won men with 26%. Buttigieg won voters with a college degree with 23%, while Sanders won among voters with a high school education or less with 30%. Sanders continued the trend of 2016 in which he won young voters, winning 44% in the 18–29 demographic and 41% with voters under 45 overall, while Buttigieg won older voters (40–64).

Contrary to media belief in Biden's strength among non-white voters, Sanders won that demographic in Iowa with 46% support, with Buttigieg placing second with 15% and Biden placing third with only 13% support. According to CNN reported entrance polls, Buttigieg won white voters with 23%. However, The New York Times indicates a statistical tie at 23%, with a slight advantage to Sanders. Some counties carried by Buttigieg, such as Clinton County, had swung from Obama in 2012 to Trump in 2016 by double digits.

Although Latinos constitute a relatively small portion of Iowa's electorate, Sanders performed exceptionally well with Latino voters, winning all 32 Latino-majority and plurality precincts in the state with 52.6% of the vote, well ahead of Buttigieg (14%) and Biden (13.5%). He also won all four Spanish-language satellite caucus sites by overwhelming margins. Matt A. Barreto noted that Sanders's strength among the Latino demographic alone provided him with an 18.6 SDE advantage over Buttigieg, making up lost ground in other demographics where Buttigieg performed better. Sanders's success with Latino voters could be credited to the "Latino strategy" his campaign is pursuing by focusing on Latino voter outreach.

Buttigieg declared victory before any official results were released. Bernie Sanders' campaign also declared victory before the official results were announced, as the DNC called for a recanvass. Buttigieg's declaration of victory in Iowa provided him with a boost in polls going into New Hampshire, a state where Sanders had been polling consistently well.

Besides technical glitches, the meltdown of the caucuses were also fueled by argument over whether Iowa should be first to vote, as many point out the state's overwhelming white population which doesn't reflect the Democratic Party and the country as a whole. In April 2022, a DNC panel voted to strip Iowa of its "first-in-the-nation" status.

See also
 2020 Iowa Republican presidential caucuses

Footnotes

References

External links
 The Green Papers delegate allocation summary
 Iowa Democratic Party draft delegate selection plan 
 FiveThirtyEight Iowa caucus poll tracker
 Des Moines Register Iowa candidate tracker
 Iowa's caucus app was a disaster waiting to happen

Iowa Democratic
Iowa Democratic
Democratic caucus
2020
Iowa Democratic caucuses